William Claude Donald (28 July 1899 – 1 November 1987) was an Australian rules footballer who played with Carlton and Fitzroy in the Victorian Football League (VFL).

Notes

External links 

Bill Donald's profile at Blueseum

1899 births
1987 deaths
Carlton Football Club players
Fitzroy Football Club players
Australian rules footballers from New South Wales